Daminah al-Gharbiyah (also spelled Dumaynah Gharbiyah) is a village in central Syria, administratively part of the Homs Governorate, located southwest of Homs. Nearby localities include Qattinah to the northeast, al-Buwaydah al-Sharqiyah to the east, Daminah al-Sharqiyah to the southeast, al-Dabaah to the south, Arjoun and al-Houz to the southwest and al-Ghassaniyah to the west. According to the Central Bureau of Statistics (CBS), Daminah al-Gharbiyah had a population of 1,012 in the 2004 census.

References

Populated places in al-Qusayr District